The men's long jump F46 event at the 2008 Summer Paralympics took place at the Beijing National Stadium at 17:55 on 10 September. There was a single round of competition; after the first three jumps, only the top eight had 3 further jumps.
The competition was won by Arnaud Assoumani, representing .

Results

 
WR = World Record. SB = Seasonal Best.

References

Athletics at the 2008 Summer Paralympics